KDNR (88.7 FM) is a radio station licensed to South Greeley, Wyoming, United States. The station carries religious programming. The station is currently owned by  Western Inspirational Broadcasters.

History
The station was assigned the call letters KWRZ on 2002-06-19. On 2003-11-22, the station changed its call sign to KLCQ and on 2006-03-27 to KKGN. On 2007-03-09 the station became KEZF, and finally on 2008-05-16, the current KDNR.

Translators
In addition to the main station, KDNR is relayed by an additional two translators to widen its broadcast area.

References

External links

Radio stations established in 2002
2002 establishments in Wyoming
DNR
Laramie County, Wyoming